"Rock My World" is the name of a 1988 hit single by British pop group Five Star. It became their last UK Top 40 hit, peaking at #28. The video saw the band leather clad, with long hair extensions, dancing in the bottom of a quarry, with dumper trucks driving around them. The B-side, "Sweetest Innocence", received a BPI award for best instrumental.

Throughout 1988, Five Star's record sales continued to decline. Their album Rock the World, from which this single came from, only reached #17 on the album chart (their lowest placing for an album at that time). The next single, "There's a Brand New World", would bring Five Star's run of 15 Top 40 hits to an end when it only reached #61.

Track listings
7" single and 7" foldout pack:

1. "Rock My World"

2. "Sweetest Innocence" (Deniece Pearson)

12" single:

1. "Rock My World" (Extra Terrestrial Mix)

2. "Rock My World" (Extra Terrestrial Dub)

3. "Sweetest Innocence"

All tracks available on the remastered versions of either the 2012 'Rock The World' album, the 2013 'The Remix Anthology (The Remixes 1984–1991)' or the 2018 'Luxury – The Definitive Anthology 1984-1991' boxset.

Five Star songs
1988 singles
Songs written by Leon Sylvers III
1988 songs
RCA Records singles